"The One with All the Candy" is the ninth episode of Friends seventh season. It first aired on the NBC network in the United States on December 7, 2000.

Plot
Monica decides that she would like to get to know the neighbours in the apartment building better (to Chandler's dislike) and resorts to doing what she does best: cooking. She makes a batch of wonderful chocolates and hangs them on the door in a basket hoping that her neighbors will take some and they can meet. The neighbours (including Joey) eventually go crazy over the candy and demand more. Eventually, Chandler admonishes the neighbors for taking advantage of Monica's kindness and not making an effort to get to know her, and furiously sends them home.

Ross gets Phoebe her first bike after hearing her story on how she never got to ride one during her childhood. Then the gang finds out she does not know how to ride. So Ross takes Phoebe to the park to teach her, but she is reluctant. With Ross' convincing and training wheels, Phoebe eventually manages to ride the bike.

Rachel and her assistant Tag have started dating, but they strive to keep their relationship a secret from their workplace. After Rachel writes a flirtatious joke evaluation, she sends it to Tag, who does not know it is fake, does not read it, and gives it to Human Resources. Rachel devises a scheme to get it back, but before she does, Mr. Zelner reads it and warns her that she is putting her job at risk. Tag takes the blame, claiming that he had written the evaluation himself. Zelner accepts this and leaves without any further incident, after saying he enjoys a "naughty limerick or two."

Reception
Distractify ranked it the ninth best Friends Christmas episode, and wrote that Phoebe's "blunders and Ross's patient lessons set the stage for many nervous laughs and heartwarming holiday cheer".

Catriona Wightman from Digital Spy called it the season's worst episode.

Sam Ashurst from the same website ranked the episode 119 on their ranking of the 236 Friends episodes.

Telegraph & Argus also ranked it #119 on their ranking of the 236 Friends episodes.

References

2000 American television episodes
Friends (season 7) episodes